Empfertshausen is a municipality in the Wartburgkreis district of Thuringia, Germany.

References

Wartburgkreis